St. Ignatius Church may refer to:

Argentina
St. Ignatius Church (Buenos Aires)

Australia
St Ignatius Church, Norwood, Adelaide, South Australia
St Ignatius' Church, Richmond
St. Ignatius Loyola Church, Toowong

Austria
Old Cathedral, Linz, also called the Church of Ignatius

Canada
St. Ignatius Church, Montreal, Quebec
St Ignatius Church, Winnipeg

Cayman Islands
St. Ignatius Church, George Town

Chile
Church of Saint Ignatius (Santiago de Chile)

Colombia

Czech Republic
St. Ignatius Church, Prague

France

Germany

India
St Ignatius Church, Thiruvananthapuram, Kerala, India

Ireland
St Ignatius Church, Galway, Ireland

Italy
Sant'Ignazio Church, Rome

Sant'Ignazio all'Olivella

Japan
St. Ignatius Church, Tokyo

Philippines
San Ignacio Church (Intramuros)

Serbia

Singapore
Catholic Church of St. Ignatius, Singapore, a Catholic church located at King's Road

Spain

United Kingdom
St. Ignatius Church, Preston, Lancashire
St. Ignatius Church, Stamford Hill, London
St. Ignatius Church, Wishaw, Scotland

United States
Saint Ignatius Church (San Francisco), California
St. Ignatius Loyola Church (Denver, Colorado)
Saint Ignatius Church, Baltimore, Maryland
St. Ignatius Church (Forest Hill, Maryland), listed on the National Register of Historic Places in Harford County, Maryland
St. Ignatius Church (Oxon Hill, Maryland), listed on the National Register of Historic Places in Prince George's County, Maryland
St. Ignatius Church (Port Tobacco Village, Maryland)
St. Ignatius Roman Catholic Church (St. Inigoes, Maryland)
Saint Ignatius Loyola Church, Houghton, Michigan
Saint Ignatius Church and Cemetery, Readmond Township, Michigan
San Ignacio Church, Albuquerque, New Mexico
Church of St. Ignatius Loyola (New York City)
St. Ignatius of Antioch Church (New York City)

See also
St. Ignatius Mission, St. Ignatius, Montana
Cathedral of St. Ignatius of Loyola (disambiguation)
St. Ignatius (disambiguation)